Urhixidur (minor planet designation: 501 Urhixidur) is a relatively large (ranked 372nd by IRAS) main belt asteroid. It was discovered on 18 January 1903, by astronomer Max Wolf (1863–1932), at the Heidelberg Observatory in southwest Germany. Like 500 Selinur and 502 Sigune, it is named after a character in Friedrich Theodor Vischer's then-bestseller satirical novel Auch Einer.

Its rotational period was reported as 15 hours in 1992, but corrected to 13.174 hours in 2013.

References

External links
 
 

000501
Discoveries by Max Wolf
Named minor planets
19030118